Stamatis Krestenitis (Greek: Σταμάτης Κρεστενίτης) was a Greek revolutionary leader during the Greek War of Independence.

Krestenitis was born in Elis and belonged to the Krestenitis family.  He battled in the Battle of Chlemoutsi together with Georgios Sisinis and Charalampos Vilaetis.

References
The first version of the article is translated and is based from the article at the Greek Wikipedia (el:Main Page)

Year of birth unknown
1823 deaths
People from Pyrgos, Elis
Greek people of the Greek War of Independence
People murdered in Greece